The Russo-Turkish War (1568–1570) or Don-Volga-Astrakhan campaign of 1569 (referred to in Ottoman sources as the Astrakhan Expedition) was a war between the Tsardom of Russia and the Ottoman Empire over the Astrakhan Khanate. It was the first of twelve Russo-Turkish wars ending with World War I in 1914-18.

In 1556, the Astrakhan Khanate was conquered by Ivan the Terrible, who had a new fortress built on a steep hill overlooking the Volga.

In 1568, the Grand Vizier Sokollu Mehmet Paşa, who was the real power in the administration of the Ottoman Empire under Selim II, initiated the first encounter between the Ottoman Empire and her future northern arch-rival Russia. The results presaged the many disasters to come. A plan to unite the Volga and Don by a canal was detailed in Constantinople.

In the summer of 1569 in response to Moscovy's interference in Ottoman commercial and religious pilgrimages, the Ottoman Empire sent a large force under Kasim Paşa of 20,000 Turks and 50,000 Tatars to lay siege to Astrakhan. Meanwhile an Ottoman fleet besieged Azov. However, a sortie from the garrison under Knyaz (prince) Serebrianyi-Obolenskiy, the military governor of Astrakhan, drove back the besiegers. A Russian relief army of 30,000 attacked and scattered the workmen and the Tatar force sent for their protection. On their way home up to 70% of the remaining soldiers and workers froze to death in the steppes or became victims of attacks by Circassians. The Ottoman fleet was destroyed by a storm. The Ottoman Empire, though militarily defeated, achieved safe passage for Muslim pilgrims and traders from Central Asia and the destruction of the Russian fort on the Terek River.

References

Sources
 Attila Weiszhár and Balázs Weiszhár: Lexicon of Wars, Atheneaum publisher, Budapest 2004.
 

16th-century conflicts
Russo-Turkish wars
Military operations involving the Crimean Khanate
16th-century military history of Russia
1568 in Europe
1569 in Europe
1570 in Europe
1568 in Russia
1569 in Russia
1570 in Russia
1568 in the Ottoman Empire
1569 in the Ottoman Empire
1570 in the Ottoman Empire
Ivan the Terrible